Milan Mijailović (born 18 September 1981) is a Serbian retired football forward and current coach.

Playing career
Mijailović began playing in the First League of FR Yugoslavia  in 1997 with FK Borac Čačak. In 2001, he played with Hajduk Kula with a loan spell with Borac Čačak in 2004. He played in the Serbian First League in 2005 with Radnički Pirot. In 2007, he played in the Serbian SuperLiga with FK Mladost Lučani, and with FK Jagodina the following season. In 2009, he played with FK Metalac Gornji Milanovac.

In 2010, he returned to the Serbian First League to play with FK Sloga Kraljevo, and the following season played abroad in the Ykkönen with Oulun Palloseura. After a season abroad he returned to play with FK Sloga, and later with FK Polet Ljubić. In 2012, he played in the Serbian League Belgrade with FK Kovačevac.

Managerial career
He was a football coach for FK Takovo and youth teams for Metalac Gornji Milanovac. In 2017, he was named the head coach for Serbian White Eagles FC in the Canadian Soccer League. He was also the head coach for Serbia AC for the 2017–18 season in the Arena Premier League.

References

External links
 
 

1981 births
Living people
People from Gornji Milanovac
Association football forwards
Serbian footballers
FK Hajduk Kula players
FK Borac Čačak players
FK Radnički Pirot players
FK Mladost Lučani players
FK Metalac Gornji Milanovac players
FK Sloga Kraljevo players
Serbian SuperLiga players
Serbian expatriate footballers
Serbian expatriate sportspeople in Canada
Serbian expatriate sportspeople in Finland
Expatriate footballers in Finland
Ykkönen players
Oulun Palloseura players
Serbian White Eagles FC managers
Canadian Soccer League (1998–present) managers
Serbian football managers
Serbian expatriate football managers
Expatriate soccer players in Canada
Expatriate soccer managers in Canada